Johanna (Hannie) van Leeuwen  (18 January 1926 – 1 August 2018) was a Dutch politician of the Anti-Revolutionary Party (until 1980) and its successor, the Christian Democratic Appeal (CDA) party.

References 
  Parlement.com biography

External link

1926 births
2018 deaths
Anti-Revolutionary Party politicians
Christian Democratic Appeal politicians
Commanders of the Order of Orange-Nassau
Dutch bankers
Dutch civil servants
Protestant Church Christians from the Netherlands
Dutch resistance members
Dutch sociologists
Dutch women sociologists
Women mayors of places in the Netherlands
Knights of the Order of the Netherlands Lion
Mayors in South Holland
Members of the House of Representatives (Netherlands)
Members of the Senate (Netherlands)
Officers of the Order of Orange-Nassau
People from Delft
People from Zoetermeer
Vrije Universiteit Amsterdam alumni
20th-century Dutch women